The LG Vu 3 is an Android smartphone/tablet computer hybrid ("phablet"), released in September 2013 and noted for its 5.2-inch screen size—between that of conventional smartphones, and larger tablets. It is powered by a 2.26 GHz quad-core Krait 400 CPU with Adreno 330 GPU and runs on Android 4.2.2  Jelly Bean. Android 4.4.2 KitKat was also announced for update on 14 March, 2014.

See also
 LG Optimus
 LG Vu series
 List of LG mobile phones
 Comparison of smartphones

References
 LG Optimus Vu 3 Specifications GSMArena
 LG Vu 3 with 5.2-inch display, Snapdragon 800 processor unveiled NDTV Gadgets

Android (operating system) devices
LG Electronics mobile phones
LG Electronics smartphones
Phablets
Discontinued smartphones
Mobile phones with infrared transmitter